Acharpura is a village in the Bhopal district of Madhya Pradesh, India. It is located in the Huzur tehsil and the Phanda block.

In the 2000s, the Government of Madhya Pradesh made attempts to develop the area into a "Special Education Zone", but did not attract much interest from the investors. In 2008, the Government allocated 110 acres to Anil Ambani's Dhirubhai Ambani Memorial Trust (DAMT) for a private university, but the Trust abandoned the project in 2015.

Demographics 

According to the 2011 census of India, Acharpura has 196 households. The effective literacy rate (i.e. the literacy rate of population excluding children aged 6 and below) is 62.04%.

References 

Villages in Huzur tehsil